The 1904–05 Colgate Raiders men's basketball team represented Colgate University during the 1904–05 college men's basketball season. The head coach was Ellery Huntington Sr. coaching the Raiders in his fifth season. The team had finished with an overall record of 10–7.

Schedule

|-

References

Colgate Raiders men's basketball seasons
Colgate
Colgate
Colgate